Patent Information News is a trilingual, quarterly magazine published by the Principal Directorate Patent Information of the European Patent Office (EPO), Vienna sub-office, Austria.

History and profile
Patent Information News was launched in the early 1990s. At that time, it was known as EPIDOS news, and the name Patent Information News was apparently adopted in 2006. It is published in English, German and French, the three official languages of the EPO. It often contains articles about the online search service Espacenet, patent documentation and search strategies.

See also
 List of intellectual property law journals

References

External links
 Patent Information News on the European Patent Office web site
 

2006 establishments in Austria
English-language magazines
French-language magazines
German-language magazines
Intellectual property law magazines
Legal magazines
Magazines established in 2006
Magazines published in Vienna
Quarterly magazines